Alanna Stephanie Kennedy (born 21 January 1995) is an Australian professional soccer player who plays as a defender for Manchester City in the English FA Women's Super League, as well as the Australia national team. Kennedy is recognized as being a versatile, technical player and is a right-footed free kick specialist. Known on the international level as a centre back, Kennedy also plays in the midfielder position.

Early life
Kennedy was raised in the Sydney suburb of Rosemeadow and attended primary school at Rosemeadow Public and selective sports school Westfields Sports High School. As a youth, she was the only girl on an all-boys team and later played for the Campbelltown Cobras. She trained with the Girls Skills Acquisition Program (GSAP) at MacArthur Rams. Kennedy acknowledged the Rams training ground as her "second home" growing up.

Club career

W-League Beginnings, 2010–15
Kennedy started her W-league career playing for Sydney FC in the 2010–11 season, where she featured in 3 games. The following year, Kennedy switched clubs and joined the Newcastle Jets in the 2011–12 W-League before returning to Sydney FC in the 2012–13 season. For the 2013–14 season, she joined city rivals Western Sydney Wanderers. and in the 2014 season she joined Perth Glory. In 2015, she returned to Sydney FC and would remain there the following 2 seasons.

Western New York Flash and Orlando Pride, 2016–20
In 2016, Kennedy signed with the Western New York Flash in the National Women's Soccer League. She appeared in 17 games for the Flash in 2016. Kennedy played every minute of Western New York's two playoff games, as the Flash won the 2016 NWSL Championship.

On 19 January 2017, Kennedy was traded to the Orlando Pride in exchange for midfielder Sam Witteman. She appeared in every game for the Pride in 2017. In the final game of the regular season on 30 September, Kennedy scored the game-winning goal on a free kick in stoppage time. This win allowed Orlando to finish the regular season in 3rd place and qualify for the playoffs for the first time in club history. In the semi-final, Kennedy scored again but Orlando lost 4–1 to the Portland Thorns.

In the 2018 NWSL season, Kennedy appeared in 20 games and scored 2 goals; however, Orlando could not repeat their success of 2017 and finished outside the playoffs.

In March 2020, the impending NWSL season was postponed due to the coronavirus pandemic. An eventual restart was made through a smaller schedule 2020 NWSL Challenge Cup tournament. However, on 22 June, Orlando withdrew from the tournament following positive COVID-19 tests among both players and staff.

Melbourne City FC, 2017–18
Kennedy joined Melbourne City on loan for the 2017–18 W-League season. During the 2017–2018 season, Kennedy was named to the Westfield W-League's "Team of the Decade", which was composed of the best XI players to ever play in the W-League, as voted for by the fans.

Sydney FC, 2017–20
After spending one season at Melbourne City, Kennedy signed with Sydney FC for the 2018–19 W-League season, returning to the club she had played at for four previous seasons. On 16 February 2019 Kennedy won her third W-league Championship title with a 4–2 win over Perth Glory in the grand final. She re-signed with Sydney FC for the 2019–20 season. The team returned to the grand final in 2020 but lost to Melbourne City 1–0.

Tottenham Hotspur, 2020–21
In August, having been unable to feature for Orlando Pride in 2020 due to COVID-19 related issues, Kennedy moved to English FA WSL club Tottenham Hotspur on a six-month loan ahead of the 2020–21 season, with an option to make the move permanent.

On 12 November 2020, while on loan at Tottenham, Kennedy's NWSL playing rights were acquired by Racing Louisville FC in the 2020 NWSL Expansion Draft. Upon the expiration of her loan and NWSL contract in December 2020, Kennedy instead opted to remain in England and sign permanently with Tottenham until the end of the season.

Kennedy was released by Tottenham on 25 May 2021.

Manchester City, 2021–
At the end of August 2021, Kennedy signed a two-year deal with Manchester City, joining national team-mate Hayley Raso.

International career
Kennedy debuted for the Matildas against New Zealand in 2012. In 2014, at age 19, she was named to the Matildas squad for the 2014 AFC Women's Asian Cup. She appeared in three games, as Australia finished runner-up to Japan.

2015 FIFA Women's World Cup
In May 2015, Kennedy was named to Australia's 23-player roster for the 2015 FIFA Women's World Cup and was the second youngest player on their roster. Kennedy appeared in all five matches for Australia. The Matildas finished second in their group and advanced to the knockout stage. They defeated Brazil in round 16 but lost to Japan in the quarter-finals.

2016 Summer Olympics
Kennedy attended her first Olympic Games in 2016. She played every minute of Australia's four matches at Rio 2016. Their quarter-final match against Brazil was tied 0–0 after extra time and went to penalties. Kennedy was the final penalty taker for Australia; she did not score her penalty and Brazil won the match 7–6 on penalties.

Kennedy was part of the Matildas squad that won the 2017 Tournament of Nations and defeated the United States for the first time ever. At the 2018 AFC Women's Asian Cup Kennedy scored two goals for Australia. The second goal she scored was a stoppage time equalizer against Thailand in the Semi-final. Australia went on to win the game in penalties. Australia lost to Japan 1–0 in the final.

2019 FIFA Women's World Cup
In May 2019, Kennedy was named to the Matildas squad for the 2019 FIFA Women's World Cup, the second time she was included in a World Cup squad. At the World Cup, Kennedy started all four of Australia's matches. In the Round of 16 tie against Norway, Kennedy received a straight red card in the 104th minute of extra-time for a DOGSO foul on Lisa-Marie Utland. Australia went on to lose on penalties and were eliminated.

2020 Summer Olympics 
Kennedy was a member of the Matildas Tokyo 2020 Olympics squad. The Matildas qualified for the quarter-finals and beat Great Britain before being eliminated in the semi-final with Sweden. In the playoff for the Bronze medal they were beaten by the USA.

Career statistics

Club

International 

Scores and results list Australia's goal tally first, score column indicates score after each Kennedy goal.

Honours

Club
Sydney FC
 W-League Premiership: 2010–11
 W-League Championship: 2012–13, 2018–19

Perth Glory
 W-League Premiership: 2014–15

Western New York Flash
 National Women's Soccer League Championship: 2016

Melbourne City
 W-League Championship: 2017–18

Manchester City
 FA Women's League Cup: 2021-22

International
 AFF U-16 Women's Championship: 2009
 AFC Olympic Qualifying Tournament: 2016
 Tournament of Nations: 2017
 FFA Cup of Nations: 2019

Individual
 Sydney FC Player of the Year: 2015–16
 Orlando Pride 2017 Golden Swans: Coaches Award
 FIFPro 2017 Women's World XI shortlist: defender
 IFFHS AFC Woman Team of the Decade 2011–2020

See also
 List of Perth Glory FC W-League players
 List of Western Sydney Wanderers Women players
 List of foreign FA Women's Super League players
 List of Orlando Pride records and statistics
 List of foreign NWSL players

References

Further reading 
 Grainey, Timothy (2012), Beyond Bend It Like Beckham: The Global Phenomenon of Women's Soccer, University of Nebraska Press, 
 Stay, Shane (2019), The Women's World Cup 2019 Book: Everything You Need to Know About the Soccer World Cup, Books on Demand, 
 Theivam, Keiran and Jeff Kassouf (2019), The Making of the Women's World Cup: Defining stories from a sport's coming of age, Little, 
 Various (2019), Stand Up for the Future, Penguin Random House, 
 Williams, Jean (2007), A Beautiful Game: International Perspectives on Women's Football , A&C Black, 
 Williams, Lydia (2019), Saved!, Allen & Unwin,

External links

 Australia player profile
 Orlando Pride player profile 
 
 
 
 
 
 

1995 births
Living people
Australian women's soccer players
Sydney FC (A-League Women) players
Newcastle Jets FC (A-League Women) players
Western Sydney Wanderers FC (A-League Women) players
Perth Glory FC (A-League Women) players
Western New York Flash players
Orlando Pride players
Melbourne City FC (A-League Women) players
A-League Women players
National Women's Soccer League players
Australia women's international soccer players
2015 FIFA Women's World Cup players
Footballers at the 2016 Summer Olympics
Soccer players from Sydney
Women's association football midfielders
Expatriate women's soccer players in the United States
Australian expatriate sportspeople in the United States
Olympic soccer players of Australia
2019 FIFA Women's World Cup players
Tottenham Hotspur F.C. Women players
Manchester City W.F.C. players
Women's Super League players
Australian expatriate sportspeople in England
Expatriate women's footballers in England
People educated at Westfields Sports High School
Footballers at the 2020 Summer Olympics
FIFA Century Club
Australian expatriate women's soccer players